

Empress and Queen of Haiti

Sources 

 
 
Haiti
Haiti, List of royal consorts of